This is a list of events held in 2012 by K-1, a kickboxing promotion based in Hong Kong.

K-1 World MAX 2012 World Championship Tournament Final 16

K-1 World MAX 2012 World Championship Tournament Final 16 was a kickboxing event promoted by the K-1 in association with the Dutch-based promotion It's Showtime. It took place on May 27, 2012 at the Palacio Vistalegre in Madrid, Spain. It was the 9th annual K-1 World Max (70 kg/154 lb weight class) World Championship Final and the first K-1 event since the establishment of K-1 Global Holdings Ltd by EMCOM Entertainment.

These fights were played under K-1 rules with three three-minute rounds and one extra round.

K-1 World MAX 2012 Final 16

Super fights

K-1 World Grand Prix 2012 in Los Angeles

K-1 World Grand Prix 2012 in Los Angeles was a kickboxing event held by the K-1 in association with the Romanian-based promotion SUPERKOMBAT on September 8, 2012 at the Memorial Sports Arena in Los Angeles, California.

It was a qualifying tournament and involved eight fighters with all bouts being fought under K-1 Rules (100 kg/156-220 lbs). Xavier Vigney, Rick Roufus, Jarrell Miller and Randy Blake qualified for the K-1 World Grand Prix 2012 in Tokyo Final 16. It also involved eight fighters who fought in the K-1 MAX (70 kg/154 lbs) weight division preliminaries and another eight in super fights. In total there were twenty-four fighters at the event, the majority representing the United States.

Undercard bouts
These fights were played under K-1 rules with three three-minute rounds.

K-1 MAX (70 kg/154 lb) bouts
These fights were played under K-1 rules with three three-minute rounds.

Super fights
These fights were played under K-1 rules with three three-minute rounds and an extra one round.

Heavyweight (100 kg/220 lb) Qualifications
These fights were played under K-1 rules with three three-minute rounds.

K-1 World Grand Prix 2012 in Tokyo Final 16

K-1 World Grand Prix 2012 in Tokyo Final 16 was a kickboxing event held by the K-1 in association with the Romanian-based promotion SUPERKOMBAT on Sunday, October 14, 2012 at the Ryōgoku Kokugikan in Tokyo, Japan. It was the final Elimination tournament for top sixteen fighters. The winners qualified for the K-1 World Grand Prix 2012 Final.

K-1 World MAX 2012 World Championship Tournament final

K-1 World MAX 2012 World Championship Tournament Final was a kickboxing event promoted by the K-1 promotion. It took place on December 15, 2012 in Athens, Greece. It was the 9th annual K-1 World Max (70 kg/154 lbs weight class) World Championship Final and the first K-1 event since the establishment of K-1 Global Holdings Ltd by EMCOM Entertainment.

K-1 World MAX 2012 Tournament bracket

See also
 List of K-1 events
 List of K-1 champions
 List of male kickboxers

References

External links
 Official website
 K-1 Official Youtube channel

*
*

K-1 events
2012 in kickboxing